The 43rd annual Venice International Film Festival was held on 30 August to 10 September, 1986. It was the last edition directed by Gian Luigi Rondi.

Jury
The following people comprised the 1986 jury:
 Alain Robbe-Grillet (head of jury) (France)
 Chantal Akerman (Belgium)  
 Jörn Donner (Finland)    
 Pal Gabor (Hungary) 
 Roman Gubern (Spain) 
 Pontus Hulten (Sweden) 
 Alberto Lattuada (Italy)  
 Nanni Moretti (Italy) 
 Nelson Pereira Dos Santos (Brazil)
 Eldar Shengelaya (Soviet Union)
 Fernando Solanas (Argentina)
 Peter Ustinov (United Kingdom)
 Bernhard Wicki (West Germany)
 Catherine Wyler (USA)

Official selection

In competition

Autonomous sections

Venice International Film Critics' Week
The following feature films were selected to be screened as In Competition for this section:
 Disorder (Désordre) by Olivier Assayas (France)
 Sembra morto... ma è solo svenuto (lit. "Looks dead... but has only fainted") by Felice Farina (Italy)
 Walls of Glass (aka Flanagan) by Scott Goldstein (USA)
 To Sleep so as to Dream (Yume miru yō ni nemuritai) by Kaizo Hayashi (Japan)
 Massey Sahib by Pradip Krishen (India)
 Malcolm by Nadia Tass (Australia)
 Abel by Alex van Warmerdam (Netherlands)

Awards
Golden Lion:
The Green Ray (Le rayon vert) by Eric Rohmer
Grand Special Jury Prize:
Wild Pigeon (Chuzhaya Belaya i Ryaboi) by Sergei Solovyov
A Tale of Love (Storia d'amore) by Francesco Maselli
X by Oddvar Einarson
 Silver Lion Best First Work:
A King and His Movie (La película del rey) by Carlos Sorin
Volpi Cup Best Actor:
Carlo delle Piane (Christmas Present)
Volpi Cup Best Actress:
Valeria Golino (A Tale of Love) 
Career Golden Lion:
Paolo and Vittorio Taviani

References 

Edoardo Pittalis - Roberto Pugliese, Bella di Notte, August 1996
L'Europeo, Cinema in Laguna, September 2008

External links 

Venice Film Festival 1986 Awards on IMDb

Venice
Venice
Venice
Venice Film Festival
Film
August 1986 events in Europe
September 1986 events in Europe